The 2018 Sun Belt Conference baseball tournament was held at M. L. Tigue Moore Field on the campus of the University of Louisiana at Lafayette in Lafayette, Louisiana, from May 22 to May 27, 2018. The tournament used a double-elimination format as in past years. Coastal Carolina, the winner of the tournament, earned the Sun Belt Conference's automatic bid to the 2018 NCAA Division I baseball tournament.

Seeding
In a change from previous years, the top ten teams (based on conference results) from the conference earned invites to the tournament. The teams were seeded based on conference winning percentage, with the bottom four seeds competing in a play-in round. The remaining eight teams then played a two bracket, double-elimination tournament. The winner of each bracket played each other in the championship final.

Results

Play-in round

Double-elimination round

Notes 

 Louisiana's 19–16 victory over Little Rock sets a tournament record for most combined runs (35).

References

Tournament
Sun Belt Conference Baseball Tournament
Sun Belt baseball tournament
Sun Belt Conference baseball tournament